Johann Gottfried Bernhard Bach (11 May 1715 – 27 May 1739) was a German musician. It is not known whether he composed, and his career as an organist is not in itself notable, but his life throws light on his famous father, the composer Johann Sebastian Bach.
Johann Gottfried was the fourth child of Johann Sebastian Bach and Maria Barbara Bach to reach adulthood.

Early life
He was born in Weimar, where his father was employed until 1717 when the family moved to Köthen.  His mother died in Köthen in 1720.  His father remarried the following year.

Education
In 1723 his father was appointed Thomaskantor in Leipzig. J.S. Bach is believed to have moved to Leipzig partly because of the educational opportunities there for his sons. J.G.B. Bach attended the Thomasschule, where his father was responsible for the musical education which formed an important part of the curriculum. He also studied privately with his father.

Musical career
In contrast to his elder brothers Wilhelm Friedemann and Carl Philipp Emanuel he did not get the opportunity to study at Leipzig University after finishing school.
Like his father before him, Johann Gottfried Bernhard auditioned for posts as a musician. He first served as organist at the Marienkirche, the largest church in Mühlhausen in 1735. Johann Sebastian Bach had been employed at Divi Blasii, Mühlhausen's other main church. Johann Sebastian was there in 1707–1708, and despite the briefness of his stay he was well regarded by the town council, carrying out commissions for them after moving to Weimar. He was succeeded as organist by one of his cousins.

Johann Gottfried also only spent a short time in the Mühlhausen, moving in 1737 to find a new engagement as organist at the Jakobikirche in Sangerhausen. It was a post for which his father had applied as a young man. However, a new organ by Zacharias Hildebrandt had since been installed.

In 1738, he was burdened with debt and abandoned a career in music in order to study law in Jena. There he died prematurely at age 24.

References 

Johann Gottfried Bernhard Bach
German classical organists
German male organists
People educated at the St. Thomas School, Leipzig
Pupils of Johann Sebastian Bach
1715 births
1739 deaths
18th-century German male musicians
18th-century keyboardists
Male classical organists